Caryocolum gallagenellum is a moth of the family Gelechiidae. It is found in France, Germany and Italy.

References

Moths described in 1989
gallagenellum
Moths of Europe